The 3rd Belorussian Front was a Front of the Red Army during the Second World War.

The 3rd Belorussian Front was created on 24 April 1944 from forces previously assigned to the Western Front. Over 381 days in combat, the 3rd Belorussian Front suffered 166,838 killed, 9,292 missing, and 667,297 wounded, sick, and frostbitten personnel while advancing from the region some 50 kilometers southeast of Vitebsk in Russia to Königsberg in East Prussia.

Operations the 3rd Belorussian Front took part in include the Belorussian Offensive Operation, the Baltic Offensive Operation, and the East Prussian Offensive Operation. Although costly, the advance of the 3rd Belorussian Front was in great part victorious, with one of the few defeats occurring during the Gumbinnen Operation in October 1944.

3rd Belorussian Front was formally disbanded on 15 August  1945.

Commanders 
 Colonel General Ivan Chernyakhovsky [promoted to full General on 26 June 1944] (April 1944 – February 1945)
 Marshal of the Soviet Union Aleksandr Vasilevsky (February–April 1945)
 General Hovhannes Bagramyan (April–August 1945)

Citations and sources 

Belorussian 3

de:Westfront (Rote Armee)#3. Weißrussische Front